Modasa is one of the 182 Legislative Assembly constituencies of Gujarat state in India. It is part of Aravalli district.

List of segments
This assembly seat represents the following segments,

 Modasa Taluka
 Dhansura Taluka

Members of Legislative Assembly
 2007 - Dilipsihji Parmar, Bharatiya Janata Party
 2012 - Rajendrasinh Thakor, Indian National Congress

Election results

2022

2017

2012

See also
 List of constituencies of the Gujarat Legislative Assembly
 Aravalli district

References

External links
 

Assembly constituencies of Gujarat
Aravalli district